Spears may refer to:

 A plural of spear
 Spears (surname), people with the surname Spears
 Spears (album), a 1985 album by Tribal Tech
Spears, Kentucky
 Kubota Spears, Japanese Top-League rugby team
 Southern Spears, a South African rugby team
 Spears Motorsports, a defunct NASCAR Craftsman Truck Series team

See also
 Spear (disambiguation)
 Speers (disambiguation)
 Spears House (disambiguation)